The Meeting Point 2000 was a political party in Suriname. 
At the last legislative elections, held on 25 May 2005, the party was part of the "A1" electoral alliance that won 6.2% of the popular vote and three out of 51 seats in the National Assembly.

Defunct political parties in Suriname